Instrumental Quarter is an Italian instrumental post-rock band, formed in 1999 in Cuneo.

Band members
Paride Lanciani - guitar - (Founder: 1999 - today) 
Tommaso Fia - keyboards (2016 - today) 
Nicolas Joseph Roncea - bass (2016 - 2018) 
Simone Rossi - drums (2016 - 2018)

Former 
Luigi Racca - bass (1999 - 2002) 
Marco Allocco - cello (1999 - 2002) 
Flavio Cravero - drums (1999 - 2002) 
Luca Bleu - drums and percussions (2002 - 2006) 
Gabriele Fioritti - cello (2002 - 2006) 
Francesco Calabrese - videoart (2002 - 2006) 
Gabriele Grosso - bass (2002 - 2009) 
Davide Arneodo - piano, violin (2004 - 2009)  
Marco Bognanni - drums (2004 - 2009)

Discography
 No More Secrets (2003), Sick Room
 Traffic Jam (2006), Sick Room
 Free (2007), Stiff Slack

External links
 Sick Room Records

Italian post-rock groups
Italian musicians